Mattoon Community Unit School District 2 is a unified school district located in the city of Mattoon, which in turn is located in Coles County, Illinois.

History
Today, Mattoon's chief school district is composed of four schools: Riddle Elementary School, which serves grades K-5; Arland D. Williams, Jr. Elementary School, another elementary school that parallels Riddle in terms of grades; Mattoon Middle School, the district's bridge between the elementary and high schools, serves grades 6-8. Mattoon High School serves grades 9-12, finalizing education for students in the community unit school district. The school runs a prekindergarten program called the Neil Armstrong Program at Hawthorne School, which is run by Principal Ida Cockrum and Director Connie Huffman.  The current superintendent is Tim Condron, while the principals of each of the respective schools are Bruce Barnard of Riddle Elementary, Kris Maleske of Williams Elementary, Jeremie Smith of Mattoon Middle, and Michelle Sinclair of Mattoon High. The mascot of Mattoon High School is the green wave, while the mascot of Mattoon Middle School is the wildcat.

The original Mattoon High School, famous for its fish-shaped fountain, was relocated in 1956; the fish fountain, which symbolizes the past and future of the district's students, was moved to the new high school in 2005 during renovations.

Extracurricular activities

Mattoon Community Unit School District 2 runs several programs, including that of National Junior Honor Society in Mattoon Middle School   a regional-worthy soccer team, a state-champion runner-up softball team, and a volleyball team.

External links

References

Education in Coles County, Illinois
School districts in Illinois